Guala may refer to:

People
 Guala Bicchieri (c. 1150 – 1227), Italian diplomat and papal legate in England
 Sebastiano Guala, Italian church architect active in the years 1640–1680
 Pier Francesco Guala, also known as Pierfrancesco and Pietro Francesco (1698–1757), Italian Baroque painter
 Guala da Telgate bishop of Bergamo

Places
 Gaula River (Sør-Trøndelag)